The Movimiento al Socialismo is a Bolivian political party.

Movement for Socialism and Movimiento al Socialismo may also refer to:

 Movimiento al Socialismo (Argentina)
 Movement for Socialism (Britain)
 Movimiento al Socialismo (Honduras)
 Movement for Socialism (Switzerland)
 Movimiento al Socialismo (Venezuela)

See also
 Movement for a Socialist Future